Feel the Force is a British television police sitcom produced for BBC Scotland by Catherine Bailey Limited.

The series is written by Georgia Pritchett; the first episode was broadcast on BBC 2 on 8 May 2006. The series was directed by Tristram Shapeero and produced by Catherine Bailey.

Main characters
Sally Bobbins (Michelle Gomez): a control freak who lives and breathes the police force who's peeved to be partnered with someone so incompetent as Frank.
Sally Frank (Rosie Cavaliero): Delusional, incompetent, optimistic and totally dependent on Bobbins. Has an unrequited love for fellow officer PC MacBean who has a secret passion for his partner PC MacGregor.
Sergeant Beasley (Leigh Zimmerman): a tall and terrifying woman who finds Frank and Bobbins a constant source of irritation.

Episodes

Theme Music
The three stars (Gomez, Cavaliero and Zimmerman) sing the theme tune (a version of the UK hit single 'Can You Feel the Force' by The Real Thing). They recorded it with Jonathan Whitehead.

See also
Smack the Pony, a sketch show with material written by Georgia Pritchett and co-directed by Tristram Shapeero.
Green Wing, a sitcom starring Michelle Gomez as Sue White, and co-directed by Tristram Shapeero, with Rosie Cavaliero making guest appearances.

External links

BBC Press Release

2000s British sitcoms
2006 Scottish television series debuts
2006 Scottish television series endings
BBC television sitcoms
Films shot in Edinburgh
2000s British crime television series
2000s Scottish television series